The Donlands Theatre is located at 387 Donlands Avenue near Plains Road in Toronto, Ontario, Canada. It operated as a movie theatre in the Bloom and Fine chain, until 1969.
In the 1970s, it reopened, showing Bollywood films. It seated 838 patrons and is now a recording studio.

The Biographical Dictionary of Canadian Architects asserts it was designed in 1946, and was one of 69 theatres designed by the architectural firm Kaplan & Sprachman.
However, local Toronto film historian Doug Taylor asserts it was designed by Herbert Duerr in 1949. Another source asserts it was constructed in 1948.

John Michailidis, writing in the East York Mirror, reported that actor John Candy had grown up nearby, and speculated that patronizing the theatre contributed to his love of movies.''

Early in his career, Canadian writer Pierre Berton, his wife, and two young children lived in a one room apartment next door to the theatre.

References

Theatres in Toronto